Joseph Yegba Maya (born 8 April, 1944 in Otele, Cameroon) is a former Cameroonian footballer. His younger brother, Martin Maya also represented Cameroon.

External links
Profile and stats

1944 births
Living people
People from Centre Region (Cameroon)
Cameroonian footballers
Cameroon international footballers
1972 African Cup of Nations players
Association football forwards
Ligue 1 players
Ligue 2 players
Olympique de Marseille players
Valenciennes FC players
RC Strasbourg Alsace players
Expatriate footballers in France
Cameroonian expatriate footballers
AS Béziers Hérault (football) players